The Boxing Union of Ireland (BUI) is the governing and sanctioning body for professional boxing in Ireland.

Foundation and organisation
The BUI was founded in 1980, and replaced the BBBofC associated "Irish Boxing Board of Control", which had overseen professional boxing in Ireland through the 1960s and 1970s. The BUI is based at Chancery Place in Dublin and (as of 2017) the president was Brian McKeever.

Amateur boxing in Ireland is run by a separate organisation, the IABA, who operate on an all island basis.

Legal case regarding the BUI and Deirdre Nelson
Deirdre Nelson was granted a professional boxing licence by the British Boxing Board of Control in February 1999, which gave her the right to box anywhere within the European Boxing Union. However, the Boxing Union of Ireland (BUI) forbid her to box until guidelines on women’s boxing were issued by the European Boxing Union in September 1999. In 2001 Nelson won a sex discrimination case against the BUI due to this; she was awarded £1,500 in compensation. The Employment Equality Authority (based in Dublin) stated that the BUI had discriminated against Nelson, violating the Employment Equality Act of 1977.

Current Irish champions

Former champions

Bantamweight

Super-bantamweight

Featherweight

Super-featherweight

Lightweight

Light-welterweight

Welterweight

Super-welterweight

Middleweight

Super-middleweight

Light-heavyweight

Cruiserweight

Heavyweight

References

External links
 

1980 establishments in Ireland
Boxing in Ireland
Professional boxing organizations
Boxing, professional